Pantsuit Politics is an American political podcast hosted by Sarah Stewart Holland and Beth Silvers, which started in November 2015. Stewart and Holland stated that their goal is to guide listeners in navigating difficult political conversations with "grace and respect." Episodes are released twice weekly.

Background
Both Holland and Silvers attended Transylvania University in Lexington, Kentucky, where they met in 1999 as members of the Phi Mu sorority and became friends. Holland majored in political science and Silvers majored in business, and both women graduated in 2003. 

Both Silvers and Holland are Christians.

Holland received her juris doctor from American University Washington College of Law, and later began her career as a congressional staffer, campaign aide, and social media consultant. Holland worked for the Hillary Clinton 2008 presidential campaign. She is an eighth-generation Kentuckian and lives in Paducah, Kentucky, where she served as City Commissioner. 

Silvers received a juris doctor from the University of Kentucky College of Law. Prior to Pantsuit Politics, Silvers practiced law and worked as a human resources executive. She worked as a business consultant in addition to her work with Pantsuit Politics, until she transitioned to working on the podcast full-time in 2021. Silvers lives in Union, Kentucky. 

Holland's husband, Nicholas, wanted her to start a podcast, and Holland had the initial idea for a podcast called Pantsuit Politics. She wanted to create a podcast that highlighted women working in politics. Holland and Silvers began discussing political issues on Holland's blog. After realizing that they had differing opinions, but the same values, they decided to create the podcast together to highlight their differing perspectives, and to bring more female voices into politics. At the time, Holland was a Democrat and Silvers was a Republican. In November 2015, they released their first episode. They opened the podcast by describing themselves as "Sarah from the Left" and "Beth from the right." 

Silvers did not support Donald Trump, and in 2019 changed her voter registration due to the Republican Party’s support of Trump and what Silvers considered to be the party's abandonment of Republican values. After Silvers left the Republican Party, Holland and Silvers' political views grew closer, and they changed their opening line to "the home of grace-filled political conversations." 

They hosted a second podcast, The Nuanced Life from 2017 to 2020.

In 2019, Holland and Silvers were the keynote speakers at the Nebraska Women's Leadership Network Conference. They also appeared on an episode of Morning Joe in April 2019.

Reception
In the first four years of the podcast, Pantsuit Politics received more than four million downloads. In February 2021, the podcast was featured on Apple Podcasts Spotlight as the second-ever featured podcast. In December 2021, the podcast was named one of Apple Podcasts' "Shows of the Year".

Books
In 2019, Holland and Silvers released a book, I Think You’re Wrong (But I’m Listening): A Guide to Grace-Filled Political Conversation, which was published by Thomas Nelson. The book is intended to provide readers with a framework for navigating political conversations with people who do not share the same political views. Silvers and Holland state that, in creating the book, they tried to convert their style of discussion on their podcast into a methodology.

In May 2022, Holland and Silvers released a second book titled, Now What? How to Move Forward When We're Divided (about basically everything), published by Revell Publishing. The book aims to inform readers about how communities can work together to create a better world.

References

External links
Official website

2015 podcast debuts
2015 establishments in Kentucky
Audio podcasts
Political podcasts
News podcasts
American women podcasters
American podcasters